The 2nd Gibraltar Brigade was a British Army garrison brigade during the Second World War.

History
After serving as part of the Garrison of Gibraltar from  24 April 1941 to 1 December 1943, it was redesignated as the 28th Infantry Brigade and as such saw action in and Italy as part of the 4th Infantry Division with the British Eighth Army. From December 1944 through to August 1945 the 28th Infantry Brigade served in Greece during the Greek Civil War with Lieutenant General Ronald Scobie's III Corps.

Formation

As 2nd Gibraltar Brigade
 2nd Battalion, Somerset Light Infantry
 4th Battalion, Devonshire Regiment
 7th Battalion, King's Own Royal Regiment (Lancaster)
 1st Battalion, Bedfordshire and Hertfordshire Regiment
 2nd Battalion, King's Regiment (Liverpool)

As 28th Infantry Brigade
 2nd Battalion, King's Regiment (Liverpool)
 2nd Battalion, Somerset Light Infantry
 1st Battalion, Argyll and Sutherland Highlanders
 2/4th Battalion, Hampshire Regiment

External links 
 
 
 Garrison of Gibraltar Nov.1942

Gibraltar
Gibraltar in World War II
Military units and formations established in 1941
1941 establishments in Gibraltar
Military units and formations disestablished in 1943